Ness is the northernmost part of the Isle of Lewis, a community consisting of about 16 villages, including Lionel, Habost, Swainbost, Cross, North and South Dell, Cross Skigersta, Skigersta, Eorodale, Adabroc, Port of Ness, Knockaird, Fivepenny and Eoropie. It was the most north-westerly community in the European Union, when the United Kingdom was a member. Its most northerly point is the Butt of Lewis. The name Ness derives from the old Norse for headland and many of the other place names in the area also have a Norse origin.

Ness is part of the Galson Estate, which is owned by Urras Oighreachd Ghabhsainn (Galson Estate Trust) which is managed by 10 local trustees elected by the community. The hand-over took place on 12 January 2007.

Ness can also be reached by walking across the moor from North Tolsta in Back to Skigersta.

Scottish Gaelic is the language of the community with 75% being able to speak it. Peat cut from the moor, is used as a fuel for cooking and heating in many homes, but its use is on the decline. The 2001 Census results show a resident population of just under 1,000. In 1831 Ness had a population of just over 3,000.

Landmarks include the 13th-century Teampull Mholuaidh in Eoropie and the small island of Dùn Èistean which is the ancestral home of the Lewis Morrisons of the Clan Morrison. There is a road sign to the bridge across to Dùn Èistean, and archaeological excavations have been taking place there. Morrisons of Harris and Lewis can traditionally be found around Nis, and in the north-west Highlands in the county of Sutherland around the town of Durness (Scottish Gaelic: Diùranais).

Each year 10 men from Ness go out to the island of Sula Sgeir in late August for a fortnight to harvest around 2,000 young gannets known locally as Guga. The Guga hunt is a Ness tradition and the bird considered a delicacy.

A Ness boat builder called John F. Macleod from Port saved 40 lives following the sinking of H.M.Y. Iolaire by managing to take a line to shore.

Ness is known for its Sgoth, a type of clinker built skiff with a dipping lug sail. The boats were used for line fishing until the early half of the twentieth century. There are several still in active use owned by community trusts which maintain them.

School
Lionel School is the school providing for Ness. Lionel School prides itself on its sporting prowess and pupils have won trophies for football, running, badminton and swimming. The school roll is 116.

The small school at Cross closed in 2011 due to declining rolls, latterly having only 19 pupils. The buildings have now been taken over by Comunn Eachdraidh Nis, the Ness Historical Society.

Sport
Football is the main sport with Ness FC playing their home matches on Fivepenny Machair. 'Spors Nis' is a new (2007) Community Sports Centre with all the modern facilities you would expect including a two lane 10 pin bowling alley.  Lionel School also has a swimming pool which is open to the public when not in use by the school.

References

Further reading
Nis Aosmhor: The photographs of Dan Morrison, edited by Finlay Macleod, October 1997, Acair Ltd,

External links

Census results 2001 for Ness
Comunn Eachdraidh Nis (Ness Historical Society)
Cuan Ard Press  (A Ness-based publishing company)
The Galson Estate Trust
Lionel School
Taigh Dhonnchaidh (Arts and Music Centre)
Eoropie Tearoom
sporsnis local sports centre

Isle of Lewis
Surfing locations in Scotland